Abraham Low (1891–1954) was an American neuropsychiatrist noted for his work in establishing self-help programs for people with mental illness, and for his criticism of Freudian psychoanalysis.

Early years
Low was born February 28, 1891, in Baranów Sandomierski, Poland.

Low attended grade school, high school and medical school in France from 1910 to 1918. He continued his medical education in Austria, serving in the Medical Corps of the Austrian Army. He graduated with a medical degree in 1919, after his military service, from the University of Vienna Medical School. After serving an internship in Vienna, Austria from 1919 to 1920, he immigrated to the United States, obtaining his U.S. citizenship in 1927.

Career
From 1921 to 1925 he practiced medicine in both New York, New York and Chicago, Illinois. In 1925 he was appointed as an instructor of neurology at the University of Illinois College of Medicine and became an associate professor of psychiatry. In 1931 Low was appointed assistant director and in 1940 became acting director of the university's Neuropsychiatric Institute.

From 1931 to 1941 he supervised the Illinois State Hospitals. During this time he conducted demanding seminars with the staff and interviewed the most severe mental patients in the wards. In 1936, Low's Studies in Infant Speech and Thought was published by the University of Illinois Press. Some sixty papers are by Low dealing variously with such topics as: Histopathology of brain and spinal cord, studies on speech disturbances (aphasias) in brain lesions, clinical testing of psychiatric and neurological conditions, studies in shock treatment, laboratory investigations of mental diseases; and several articles on group psychotherapy had been published in medical periodicals.

Death and legacy
Low died in 1954 at the Mayo Clinic in Rochester, Minnesota. His contributions to 
the psychiatric and mental health communities are often not well known, but his work has and continues to assist numerous individuals in the area of mental health.  The psychologist and founder of REBT, Albert Ellis, credits Low as a founder of cognitive behavioral therapy.

Recovery International

In 1937, Low founded Recovery, Inc. where he served as its medical director from 1937 to 1954.  During this time he presented lectures to relatives of former patients on his work with these patients and the before and after scenarios. In 1941, Recovery Inc. became an independent organization. Low's three volumes of The Technique of Self-help in Psychiatric Aftercare (including "Lectures to Relatives of Former Patients") were published by Recovery, Inc. in 1943. Recovery's main text, Mental Health Through Will-Training, was originally published in 1950. During the organization's annual meeting in June 2007, it was announced that Recovery, Inc. would thereafter be known as Recovery International.

See also
Abraham Low Self-Help Systems

References

External links
 
Abraham Low Self-Help Systems providers of Power to Change and Recovery International
 Robin Pape: Biography of Abraham Low in: Biographical Archive of Psychiatry (BIAPSY), 2015.
Abraham Low papers available in the Special Collections and University Archives, University of Illinois Chicago.

American psychiatrists
20th-century American psychologists
American psychology writers
American male non-fiction writers
American developmental psychologists
Jewish American scientists
Polish psychologists
Polish psychiatrists
American Reform Jews
1891 births
1954 deaths
Physicians from Illinois
Polish emigrants to the United States
Scientists from Chicago
University of Vienna alumni
20th-century American male writers
20th-century American Jews